Konstantinos Mitsotakis (– 29 May 2017) was a Greek politician who was 7th Prime Minister of Greece from 1990 to 1993. He graduated in law and economics from the University of Athens. His son, Kyriakos Mitsotakis, was elected as the Prime Minister of Greece following the 2019 Greek legislative election.

Family and personal life 
Mitsotakis was born on 31 October 1918 in Halepa suburb, Chania, Crete, into an already powerful political family, linked to the distinguished statesman Eleftherios Venizelos on both sides. His grandfather  (1845–1898), a lawyer, journalist and short-time MP of then Ottoman-ruled Crete, founded the Liberal Party, then "Party of the Barefeet" with Venizelos, and married the latter's sister, Katigo Venizelou, Constantine's grandmother. The 1878 Pact of Halepa, granting an Ottoman Crete a certain level of autonomy, was signed in his very home.

Mitsotakis was married to Marika Mitsotakis (née Giannoukou) from 1953 until her death on 6 May 2012. They had four children. His son, Kyriakos Mitsotakis, is the Prime Minister of Greece and since January 2016 leader of the conservative New Democracy party (a position previously held by Mitsotakis), and was a government minister in 2013–15. His first daughter, Dora Bakoyannis, ND Member of Parliament, founder and president of Democratic Alliance party, was the mayor of Athens (2003–2006) and the Minister of Foreign Affairs from 2006 to 2009. His second daughter Alexandra Mitsotakis Gourdain is a Greek civil society activist. His third daughter is Katerina Mitsotakis.

Mitsotakis's interests outside politics included Cretan antiquities and a passion for preserving the environment. He developed a large collection of Minoan and other Cretan antiquities, which he and his wife donated to the Greek state. He was also very interested in promoting reforesting of Greece, including in particular the mountains of Crete.

Venizelos/Mitsotakis family tree

Political career
Mitsotakis was elected to the Greek Parliament for the first time in 1946, standing for the Liberal Party in his native prefecture of Chania, Crete. He followed most of the old Liberal Party into Georgios Papandreou's Center Union in 1961. He was arrested in 1967 by the military junta but managed to escape to Turkey with a help of Turkish foreign minister İhsan Sabri Çağlayangil and lived in exile with his family in Paris, France, until his return to Greece in 1974, following the restoration of democracy.

In 1974 he campaigned as an independent and failed to be elected to Parliament. He was re-elected in 1977 as founder and leader of the small Party of New Liberals and in 1978 he merged his party with Constantine Karamanlis's New Democracy (ND) party. He served as minister for economic coordination from 1978 to 1980, and as Minister for Foreign Affairs from 1980 to 1981.

The ND government was defeated by Andreas Papandreou's PASOK in 1981, and in 1984 Mitsotakis succeeded Evangelos Averoff as ND leader. He and Andreas Papandreou, the son of Georgios Papandreou, dominated Greek politics for the next decade: their mutual dislike dated back to the fall of Georgios Papandreou's government in 1965.

Mitsotakis soundly defeated Papandreou, embroiled in the Bank of Crete scandal, in the June 1989 election. PASOK lost 36 seats in one of the largest defeats of a sitting government in modern Greek history. However, in a controversial move, Papandreou's government had modified the election system just two months earlier, to require a party to win 50 percent of the vote in order to govern alone. Thus, even though ND was the clear first-place party, with 20 more seats than PASOK, it only won 44 percent of the vote, leaving it six seats short of a majority. 

After Mitsotakis failed to garner enough support to form a government, Court of Cassation president Yannis Grivas became acting prime minister and presided over new elections in November 1989. This election yielded the same result as in June. ND finished 20 seats ahead of PASOK, but only won 46.2 percent of the vote and came up three seats short of a majority. Former Bank of Greece president Xenophon Zolotas became interim prime minister and presided over fresh elections in April 1990. The result was the same as the two 1989 elections. ND won a landslide victory, finishing 27 seats ahead of PASOK. However, Mitsotakis was still unable to govern alone, as ND won 150 seats, one short of a majority. Finally, the lone MP from Democratic Renewal agreed to a coalition with ND, allowing Mitsotakis to form government by one seat.

Mitsotakis's government moved swiftly to cut government spending as much as possible, privatise state enterprises and reform the civil service. In foreign policy, Mitsotakis took the initiative to have Greece formally recognize the state of Israel, and moved to reopen talks on American bases in Greece and to restore confidence among Greece's economic and political partners. In June 1990, Mitsotakis became the first Greek Premier to visit the United States since 1974. He promised to meet Greece's NATO obligations, to prevent the use of Greece as a base for terrorism, and to stop the rhetorical attacks on the United States that had been Papandreou's hallmark. Mitsotakis also supported a new dialogue with Turkey, but made progress on the Cyprus dispute a prerequisite for improvement on other issues.

Papandreou, cleared of charges arising from the Bank of Crete scandal in a 7–6 vote at the Eidiko Dikastirio (Special Court), criticised Mitsotakis's government for its economic policies, for not taking a sufficiently strict position over the naming dispute with the newly independent Republic of Macedonia (Mitsotakis favored a composite name such as "Nova Macedonia", for which he was accused at the time of being too lenient) as well as over Cyprus, and for being too pro-American. The heightened public irritation over the Macedonia naming issue caused several ND parliament members, led by Antonis Samaras, to withdraw their support from Mitsotakis's government and form a new political party, Political Spring. Mitsotakis' government restored the pre-1989 electoral system, which allowed Papandreou's PASOK to obtain a clear parliamentary majority after winning the premature 1993 elections and return to office. Mitsotakis then resigned as ND leader, although he remained the party's honorary chairman.

In January 2004 Mitsotakis announced that he would retire from Parliament at the 7 March election, 58 years after his first election.

Death
Mitsotakis died on 29 May 2017 in Athens, aged 98 of natural causes
His state funeral was held on 31 May 2017 and he was buried in Chania.

Honours
: Companion of the Order of Australia (Honorary) (6 January 1992).

References

Further reading
 Wilsford, David, ed. Political leaders of contemporary Western Europe: a biographical dictionary (Greenwood, 1995) pp. 318–23.

External links 

 The Konstantinos Mitsotakis Foundation/Ίδρυμα Κωνσταντίνος Μητσοτάκης 

|-

|-

|-

|-

|-

|-

|-

|-

|-

|-

1918 births
2017 deaths
20th-century prime ministers of Greece
Apostasia of 1965
Centre Union politicians
Foreign ministers of Greece
Greek MPs 1946–1950
Greek MPs 1950–1951
Greek MPs 1951–1952
Greek MPs 1952–1956
Greek MPs 1956–1958
Greek MPs 1958–1961
Greek MPs 1961–1963
Greek MPs 1963–1964
Greek MPs 1964–1967

Greek MPs 1977–1981
Greek MPs 1981–1985
Greek MPs 1985–1989
Greek MPs 1989 (June–November)
Greek MPs 1989–1990
Greek MPs 1990–1993
Greek MPs 1993–1996
Greek MPs 1996–2000
Greek MPs 2000–2004
Greek Resistance members
Honorary Companions of the Order of Australia
Leaders of New Democracy (Greece)
Liberal Party (Greece) politicians
Ministers for Mercantile Marine of Greece
Konstantinos
National and Kapodistrian University of Athens alumni
National Political Union (1946) politicians
Party of New Liberals politicians
Politicians from Chania
Finance ministers of Greece
Prime Ministers of Greece
Greek military personnel of World War II